The 9th Critics' Choice Awards were presented on January 10, 2004, honoring the finest achievements of 2003 filmmaking.

Top 10 films
(in alphabetical order)

 Big Fish
 Cold Mountain
 Finding Nemo
 In America
 The Last Samurai
 The Lord of the Rings: The Return of the King
 Lost in Translation
 Master and Commander: The Far Side of the World
 Mystic River
 Seabiscuit

Winners and nominees

Passion in Film Award
Peter Weir – Master and Commander: The Far Side of the World

Lifetime Achievement Award
Clint Eastwood

Best Picture Made for Television
Angels in America
 And Starring Pancho Villa as Himself
 The Reagans

Statistics

References

Broadcast Film Critics Association Awards
2003 film awards